Sixty Six is an unincorporated community in Orangeburg County, South Carolina, United States. Sixty Six is located along U.S. Route 21, north of Branchville.

References

Unincorporated communities in Orangeburg County, South Carolina
Unincorporated communities in South Carolina